The 2008 Trail Appliances Autumn Gold Curling Classic was held October 10-13 at the Calgary Curling Club in Calgary, Alberta. It was the first Grand Slam event of the 2008-09 Women's World Curling Tour.

Teams

Playoffs

Autumn Gold Curling Classic
2008 in Canadian curling
2008 in Alberta
2008 in women's curling